Paratorchus is a genus of beetles.

Placement
Paratorchus is uncontroversially placed in the tribe Osoriini of the subfamily Osoriinae.

Distribution 
Paratorchus is indigenous to the Neotropical realm and the Australasian realm (New Zealand).

Recognition 
Paratorchus differs from Holotrochus only by having reduced eyes and elytra with indistinct sutural striae.

References 

 Irmler, U. 2015: New Neotropical genera and species of the tribe Osoriini (Coleoptera: Staphylinidae: Osoriinae). Beiträge zur entomologie (ISSN 0005-805X), 65(1): 173–196. Abstract

External links 
 iNaturalist

Staphylinidae genera
Osoriinae